Christian Yulu Ngwandjo (born 2 February 1982) is an Angolan former footballer who is last know to have played as a winger or forward for Caála.

Career

Before the second half of 2002/03, Yulu signed for Coventry City in the English second division after playing for the reserves of French Ligue 1 side Rennes.

In 2009, he signed for Boston Aztec in the American lower leagues after playing for French lower league club Châteaubriant, before joining Caála in Angola.

References

External links
 
 

Angolan footballers
Living people
Expatriate footballers in England
English Football League players
Coventry City F.C. players
Expatriate soccer players in the United States
Expatriate footballers in France
Angolan expatriate footballers
Angolan expatriate sportspeople in England
Angolan expatriate sportspeople in the United States
National Premier Soccer League players
Girabola players
Association football forwards
Association football wingers
Angolan expatriate sportspeople in France
Footballers from Luanda
1982 births